Udaariyaan is an Indian Hindi-language television family drama series that premiered on 15 March 2021 on Colors TV. Produced by Sargun Mehta and Ravi Dubey, it formerly starred Priyanka Choudhary and Ankit Gupta. Currently, it stars Isha Malviya, Twinkle Arora, Hitesh Bharadwaj, Sonakshi Batra and Rohit Purohit.

Plot
The story revolves around a love triangle between Fateh Singh Virk and two sisters, Tejo Sandhu and Jasmine Sandhu. Tejo agrees to marry Jas because of her family,. she and jass get married while Jas is a fraud and runs away with all expensive items. Fateh is a national boxing champion while Tejo is a college professor. Fateh and Tejo both want to make their future in Moga, while Jasmine has only one dream, to go to Canada. Fateh falls in love with Jasmine and wants to marry her. Jasmine falls for him too and agrees to marry him after he gets a job in Canada. But Jasmine breaks her marriage with Fateh on their wedding day when she found out he lost his job. However, she regrets it later as she realizes how Fateh loved her unconditionally. Tejo and Fateh marry to save the family's reputation. After marriage, Tejo falls for Fateh, but Fateh is still madly in love with Jasmin. But is failed and get arrested Jasmin regretting her decision, confesses her love for Fateh and starts plotting against Tejo. Fateh accepts her back and has an extramarital affair with her. Tejo coming to know about the affair and fateh asks for divorce in order to marry Jasmine.However Jasmine brings   Tejo 's first husband Jass to Fateh and tejo's life to seprate them. She gets engaged to Angad so Fateh and Jasmine can get married and receive the family's blessing. Jasmine and Fateh get married and are about to leave for Canada but Fateh burns her boarding ticket and passport and reveals that their wedding was fake and was planned by him when Jass reveals him about the evil deeds Jasmin did to get him. On the other hand, Angad falls in love with Tejo, but she declares him as her friend. Fateh and Jasmine go their separate ways, but Jasmine vows to seek vengeance against Fateh for breaking her dreams. After much trials and tribulations, Fateh and Tejo end up together. Angad and Jasmine join hands to separate them, but later, Angad realises his misdeeds and lets Tejo go. Jasmine ends up marrying Amrik, even though she was trying to marry Fateh to take revenge. Later on, Fateh, Tejo, Amrik and Jasmine get into a car accident and Jasmine turns over a new leaf after seeing Amrik and Tejo's love for her. Fateh and Tejo decide to get engaged but Fateh breaks his relationship with Tejo after he finds out that she hid Jasmine's lie. In anger, Tejo decides to marry Angad. However, on the wedding day, Tejo finds out that she is pregnant with Fateh's child. Angad tells her to go to Fateh, but in reality he set her up to get burned alive in a warehouse.

6 months later

Jasmine and Amrik decide to run away to London and start their life there as everyone in their family is still refusing to accept their relationship especially after Tejo's death. In London, Jasmine and Amrik come across Tanya, Tejo's look-a-like. Angad is also in London and he is certain that Tanya is Tejo and wants to kill her. Tanya admits to being Tejo and accuses Fateh and Jasmine of trying to kill her, which is all a misunderstanding. In the end Angad's true evil face is revealed and he is arrested for Tejo's murder. Amrik ends up dying while saving Tanya from Angad. In a shocking event, it's revealed that Tanya isn't Tejo and she was assigned by cops to find out the truth behind Tejo's murder. Tanya, Jasmine and Fateh return to Moga and make Tanya pretend to be Tejo. Jasmine finds out she is pregnant with Amrik's child and is determined to give her child the perfect life. She once again becomes obsessed with getting Fateh as she wants him to raise her child with her. However, in a shocking turn of events, Tanya reunites Tejo, who is now mentally unstable after the fire, with everyone. Jasmine tries to get rid of Tejo but she isn't able to succeed. Fateh marries Tejo and eventually Tejo regains her memories. Fateh warns Jasmine to stay away from Tejo but Tejo, who doesn't know that Jasmine tried to kill her, brings back Jasmine. Later on, Jasmine ends up miscarrying and fakes her pregnancy. She pretends to give birth and leaves an orphan at the hospital, claiming it to be Amrik and her child. Tejo and Fateh know the truth but for the family's happiness, they keep it a secret and raise the child as their own daughter. They name her Nehmat. Jasmine, on the other hand, married Yash and moved to Canada, finally accomplishing her life-long dream. However, she is in for a rude awakening when she realizes Yash married her for revenge and mistreats her.

6 years later

Jasmine returns to India with Naaz as she was suffering from domestic violence and torture by her mother-in-law and husband. Her father refuses to accept her. Tejo and Fateh have raised Nehmat up in a loving household while Jasmine and Naaz are barely getting by. Jasmine decides to leave her daughter with her family so Naaz can finally have the love of a family and happiness that Naaz deserves. She leaves behind a note saying that she doesn't wish to meet them again as she is not a great person to have in anyone's life. Naaz and Nehmat become friends and treat each other like sisters. However, Naaz starts to get jealous of the attention Nehmat is getting and misses Jasmine. Fateh and Tejo decide to adopt Naaz so Naaz will get the love and happiness that she deserves. Unfortunately, before Naaz could be officially adopted, Fateh, Tejo and the Virks all die in a car accident. Nehmat, Naaz and Tejo's family are left devastated.

16 years later

Naaz and Nehmat are all grown up. Nehmat is dating Ekam, a police officer in trainee, who wants to help Nehmat find out the reason behind the Virk family's accident and demise. Naaz is still suffering from inferiority complex for the attention Nehmat always gets and wishes to snatch all of Nehmat's happiness away from her. Nehmat always wishes well for Naaz, but Naaz is always busy plotting against Nehmat so Naaz can get everything that Nehmat has. The only one who sees Naaz's true face is Malika and hence Naaz and Mallika don't get along. Naaz tries to break Nehmat's friendship with Malika by creating misunderstandings between them by showing that Advait and Nehmat are together. Advait, in reality, is only marrying Malika to have power over Ekam so Ekam doesn't investigate the Virk family's accident. It is revealed that Advait's father and Jasmine were behind the car accident. Eventually, after a series of plots by Naaz, Nehmat is forced to marry Advait and his friendship with Malika is broken. Soon after, Harleen, Jasmine's youngest daughter, arrives in Moga and sincerely falls in love with Ekam, leaving these young people's paths even more murky.

Cast

Main
 Priyanka Choudhary as
 Tejo Kaur Sandhu Virk: Satti and Rupi's elder daughter; Jasmine and Dilraj's sister; Fateh's wife: Nehmat's adoptive  mother (2021–2022) (Dead)
 Tanya Gill: Tejo's lookalike (2022)
 Ankit Gupta as Fateh Singh Virk: Gurpreet and Khushbeer's elder son; Simran, Amrik and Mahi's brother; Tejo's first husband; Nehmat's adoptive father. (2021–2022) (Dead)
 Isha Malviya as
 Jasmine "Jassu" Kaur Sandhu Ahluwalia: Satti and Rupi's younger daughter; Tejo and Dilraj's sister; Mr. Ahluwalia's wife; Naaz and Harleen's mother (2021–present)
 Harleen Kaur Ahluwalia: Jasmine and Mr. Ahluwalia's daughter; Naaz's half-sister; Nehmat's adoptive cousin; Ekam's ex-fianceé; Advait's legal wife (2022–present)
 Twinkle Arora as Nehmat Kaur Virk: Harvinder's daughter; Tejo and Fateh's daughter; Candy, Naaz and Harleen's adoptive cousin; Advait's illegal wife; Ekam's love-interest (2022–present)
Kevina Tak as Child Nehmat Kaur Virk (2022) 
 Hitesh Bharadwaj as Ekampreet "Ekam" Randhawa: Jayveer and Renuka's son; Mallika's brother; Harleen's ex-fiancé; Nehmat's love-interest  (2022–present)
Saksham Kalia as Child Ekampreet Randhawa (2022)
 Rohit Purohit as Advait Kapoor: Shamsher and Rama's elder son; Nikhil's brother; Harleen's legal husband; Nehmat's illegal husband (2022–present)
 Sonakshi Batra as Naaz Kaur Bajwa Kapoor: Jasmine and Yash's daughter; Harleen's half-sister; Nehmat's adoptve cousin; Nikhil's wife (2022–present)
 Kanishtha Kaushik as Child Naaz Bajwa (2022)

Recurring
 Unknown as Mr Ahluwalia: Jasmine's third husband; Naaz's step-father; Harleen's father (2023-present)
 Neha Thakur as Mallika Randhawa: Jayveer and Renuka's daughter; Ekam's sister; Nehmat's childhood ex-best friend; Advait's ex-fiancée, Naaz's rival-turned-ally (2022-present)
 Gurbani Kaur Nagi as Child Mallika Randhawa (2022) 
 Samarth Jurel as Nikhil Kapoor – Shamsher and Rama's younger son; Advait's brother; Naaz's husband (2022–present) 
 Raman Dhagga as Rupinder "Rupi" Singh Sandhu – Sukhmini's younger son; Harman's brother; Satti's husband; Tejo, Jasmine and Dilraj's father; Naaz and Harleen's grandfather; Nehmat's adoptive grandfather (2021–present)
 Kamal Dadiala as Satti Kaur Sandhu – Rupi's wife; Tejo, Jasmine and Dilraj's mother; Naaz and Harleen's grandmother; Nehmat's adoptive grandmother (2021–present)
 Manish Khanna as Shamsher Kapoor – Rama's husband; Advait and Nikhil's father; Naaz's father-in-law (2022–present)
 Kavita Ghai as Rama Kapoor – Shamsher's wife; Advait and Nikhil's mother; Naaz's mother-in-law (2022–present)
 Abhiraaj Chawla / Aman Jaiswal / Tushar Dhembla / as Abhiraj Singh Sandhu – Lovely and Harman's elder son; Navraj's brother; Shelly's husband; Naaz and Harleen's uncle; Nehmat's adoptive uncle (2021–present)
 Nandini Tiwari as Shelly Kaur Sandhu – Abhiraj's wife; Naaz and Harleen's aunt; Nehmat's adoptive aunt (2022)
 Mohinder Gujral as Sukhmini Kaur Sandhu – Rupi and Harman's mother; Tejo, Jasmine, Abhiraj, Navraj and Dilraj's grandmother (2021–2022)
 Amrit Chahal as Lovely Kaur Sandhu – Harman's wife; Abhiraj and Navraj's mother (2021–present)
 Sukhpal Singh as Harman Singh Sandhu – Sukhmini's elder son; Lovely's husband; Abhiraj and Navraj's father (2021–present)
 Karan Grover as
Angad Maan – Tejo's ex-fiancé and obsessive lover; Arjun's brother; Riya's uncle and caretaker (2021-2022)
Arjun Maan – Angad's brother; Preet's husband; Riya's father (2021)
 Bhavya Sharma as Riya Maan – Preet and Arjun's daughter; Angad's niece (2021-2022)
 Unknown as Preet Maan – Arjun's wife; Riya's mother (2021)
 Abhishek Kumar as Amrik Singh Virk – Gurpreet and Khushbeer's younger son; Simran, Fateh and Mahi's brother; Jasmine's first husband (2021–2022)
 Manish Tulsiyani as Yash Bajwa – Jasmine's second husband; Naaz's father; Harleen's step father (2022)               
 Chetna Singh as Simran Kaur Virk Janjua – Gurpreet and Khushbeer's elder daughter; Fateh, Amrik and Mahi's sister; Amarpreet's ex-fiancée; Buzzo's wife; Candy's mother (2021–2022)
Jaivik Wadhwa as Candy Janjua– Simran and Amarpreet's son; Buzzo's adoptive son; Nehmaat's adoptive cousin (2021-2022)
 Virsa Riar as Buzzo Janjua – Fateh's best friend; Simran's husband; Candy's step-father (2021–2022)
 Ram Aujla as Khushbeer Singh Virk – Beeji and Bauji's elder son; Balbir and Pammi's brother; Gurpreet's husband; Simran, Fateh, Amrik and Mahi's father; Candy's grandfather; Nehmat's adoptive grandfather (2021–2022)
 Gurvinder Gauri as Gurpreet Kaur Virk – Nimmo's sister; Khushbeer's wife; Simran, Fateh, Amrik and Mahi's mother; Candy's grandmother; Nehmat's adoptive grandmother (2021-2022)
 Rashmeet Kaur Sethi as Mahi Singh Virk – Gurpreet and Khushbeer's younger daughter; Simran, Fateh and Amrik's sister (2021–2022)
 Ranjit Riaz Sharma as Bauji – Beeji's husband; Khushbeer, Balbir and Pammi's father; Simran, Fateh, Amrik and Mahi's grandfather; Candy's great-grandfather; Nehmat's adoptive great-grandfather (2021–2022)
 Jaswant Daman as Beeji – Bauji's wife; Khushbeer, Balbir and Pammi's mother; Simran, Fateh, Amrik and Mahi's grandmother; Candy's great-grandmother; Nehmat's adoptive great-grandmother (2021–2022) 
 Unknown as Balbir Singh Virk – Bauji and Beeji's younger son; Khushbeer and Pammi's brother; Nimmo's husband (2021)
 Amandeep Kaur as Nimmo Kaur Virk – Gurpreet's sister; Balbir's wife (2021–2022)
 Indresh Malik as Amanpreet Singh Bajwa – Simran's ex-fiancé; Candy's father (2022)
 Lokesh Batta as Jass Kohli – Tejo's first husband (2021)
 Loveneet Kaur as Sweety – Jasmine's best friend (2021–2022)
 Kiran Kaur as Pammi Kaur Virk Bajwa – Beeji and Bauji's daughter; Khushbeer and Balbir's sister; Manjit's wife (2021)
 Pardeep Soni as Manjit Singh Bajwa – Pammi's husband (2021)
 Anju Kapoor as Saroop – Harmaan and Rupinder's sister; Lovely and Satti's sister in-law; Tejo, Jasmine and Dilraj's aunt (2021-2022)
 Pawan Dhiman as Gurpreet and Nimmo's brother (2021)
 Mathlub Khan as Mr. Dhillon – Jasmine's assistant; a wedding decorator (2022)
 Mohit Nain as Gippy – Jasmine's ex-fiancé (2021)
 Santosh Malhotra as Mrs. Kohli – Jass's mother (2021)
 Amanpreet Kaur as Preeto – Jasmine's best friend; Neetu's sister (2021)
 Rishabh Mehta as Sandeep – Jasmine's first lover (2021)
 Sourav Jain as Aman – Tejo's student who shot Tejo (2021)
 Preet Rajput as Navraj Singh Sandhu – Lovely and Harman's younger son; Abhiraj's brother (2021–2022)
 Tavish Gupta as Dilraj Singh Sandhu – Rupy and Satti's son; Tejo and Jasmin's brother (2021–2022)

Guests
 Harnaaz Sandhu: Manika Suri, contestant in a beauty contest along with Jasmin and Tejo (2021)
 Ravi Dubey as Matsya: To promote Matsya Kaand (2021)
 Gurpreet Ghuggi for Diwali celebrations (2021)
 Gippy Grewal for Diwali celebrations (2021)
 Gurnam Bhullar for Diwali celebrations (2021)
 Avinash Mukherjee as Aarav Oswal from Sasural Simar Ka 2 (2021)
 Radhika Muthukumar as Simar Narayan from Sasural Simar Ka 2 (2021)
 Nimrit Kaur Ahluwalia as Seher Rajveer Babbar Singh from Choti Sarrdaarni (2021)
 Mahir Pandhi as Rajveer Babbar from Choti Sarrdaarni (2021)
 Aakash Ahuja as Purab Singhania from Thapki Pyaar Ki 2 (2021)
 Jigyasa Singh as Thapki Tripathi from Thapki Pyaar Ki 2 (2021)
 Sunanda Sharma for Holi celebration (2022)

Production

Casting
Priyanka Choudhary, Ankit Gupta and Isha Malviya were cast to portray the leads Tejo, Fateh and Jasmine respectively. Malviya's character later turned negative. Post the six month leap, Choudhary also played Tanya. Karan Grover was roped in as the main antagonist and had dual roles of Angad and Arjun.

In September 2022, the series took a leap, where Twinkle Arora, Hitesh Bharadwaj and Sonakshi Batra were cast as Nehmat, Ekam and Naaz respectively.

Filming
The series is set in Moga, Punjab. It has been shot in Chandigarh, since its inception. During the six months leap track, the series was shot in London.

Release
A special song promo was released with Sargun Mehta, Choudhary, Gupta and Isha Malviya alongside rapper Badshah.

Crossover
 Udaariyaan had a crossover with Choti Sarrdaarni from 19 April 2021 to 20 April 2021, where Tejo and Sarab met.

 It hosted a Bollywood themed Diwali bash in November 2021, which was attended by the cast of Colors TV's shows along with Gurpreet Ghuggi, Gippy Grewal and Gurnam Bhullar.

Awards and nominations

References

External links
 

Indian drama television series
Hindi-language television shows
2021 Indian television series debuts
Indian television soap operas
Television shows set in Punjab, India